"That's How You Know When Love's Right" is a song recorded by American country music artists Nicolette Larson and Steve Wariner. It was released in May 1986 as the second single from Larson's album Rose of My Heart. The song peaked at number 9 on the Billboard Hot Country Singles chart.  The song was written by Craig Bickhardt and Wendy Waldman.

Chart performance

References

1986 singles
1986 songs
Nicolette Larson songs
Steve Wariner songs
MCA Records singles
Songs written by Craig Bickhardt
Song recordings produced by Emory Gordy Jr.
Song recordings produced by Tony Brown (record producer)
Male–female vocal duets
Songs written by Wendy Waldman